John Miller (born August 12, 1993) is an American football guard who is a free agent. He was drafted by the Buffalo Bills with the 81st overall pick in the third round of the 2015 NFL Draft. He played college football at Louisville.

College career
Miller made 46 career starts at left guard for Louisville. He was an honorable mention All-ACC pick as a senior. In 2015, he participated in the Senior Bowl.

Professional career

Buffalo Bills

Despite his dependable college career, a poor combine hurt Miller's draft stock. He was drafted by the Buffalo Bills in the third round of the 2015 NFL Draft. With a strong offseason, Miller was named the starting right guard for 2015.

In 2017, Miller started the first four games at right guard before losing the starting job to veteran Vladimir Ducasse.

In 2018, Miller started 15 games at right guard, missing one with an ankle injury.

Cincinnati Bengals
On March 16, 2019, Miller signed a three-year, $16.5 million contract with the Cincinnati Bengals. He started 13 games at right guard in 2019.

On March 18, 2020, Miller was released by the Bengals.

Carolina Panthers
Miller signed with the Carolina Panthers on March 23, 2020. He started 14 games at right guard in 2020.

On March 31, 2021, Miller re-signed with Panthers. He suffered an ankle injury in Week 7 and was placed on injured reserve on October 26, 2021. He was activated on November 20.

Jacksonville Jaguars
Miller signed with the Jacksonville Jaguars on October 11, 2022. He was waived on November 23, 2022.

References

External links
ESPN profile
Louisville Cardinals bio
John Miller's Twitter

Living people
1993 births
Miami Central Senior High School alumni
Players of American football from Miami
American football offensive guards
Louisville Cardinals football players
Buffalo Bills players
Cincinnati Bengals players
Carolina Panthers players
Jacksonville Jaguars players